Brute Force or brute force may refer to:

Techniques
 Brute force method or proof by exhaustion, a method of mathematical proof
 Brute-force attack, a cryptanalytic attack
 Brute-force search, a computer problem-solving technique

People
 Brute Force (musician) (born 1940), American singer and songwriter

Arts and entertainment

Film
 Brute Force (1914 film), a short silent drama directed by D. W. Griffith
 Brute Force (1947 film), a film noir directed by Jules Dassin

Literature
 Brute Force, a 2008 Nick Stone Missions novel by Andy McNab
 Brute Force (Ellis book), a 1990 book by the historian John Ellis
 Brute Force: Cracking the Data Encryption Standard, a 2005 book by Matt Curtin

Other media
 Brute Force (album), a 2016 record by the Algorithm 
 Brute Force (comics), a comic by Simon Furman
 Brute Force (video game), a 2003 third-person shooter

See also

 
 
 Force (disambiguation)
 Brute (disambiguation)
 Fôrça Bruta, a 1970 album by Jorge Ben